Brunswick High School is a public high school located in Brunswick in Glynn County, Georgia, United States. It is part of the Glynn County School District and opened in 1967. In January 2014, Brunswick High School opened a new facility on 3885 Altama Avenue, becoming one of the largest new schools in the state.

The school serves sections of Brunswick, Everett, and Sterling. It also serves sections of Country Club Estates and Dock Junction.

Sports

State Titles
Boys' Basketball (1) - 2015(5A)

Notable alumni
 Ahmaud Arbery, murder victim
 Justin Coleman, NFL player for the Detroit Lions
 ReShard Lee, NFL player for the Dallas Cowboys
 Raymond M. Lloyd, professional wrestler known as Glacier
 Kenny Mainor, CFL player for the Calgary Stampeders
 Darius Slay, NFL player for the Philadelphia Eagles
 Tracy Walker, NFL player for the Detroit Lions
 Jaelin Williams, soccer player for the Bahamas national football team

See also
 Glynn Academy

References

External links

 Brunswick High School
 In the Game high school sports magazine – recognizing high school athletes and sports in Georgia

Schools in Glynn County, Georgia
Public high schools in Georgia (U.S. state)
Brunswick, Georgia
Educational institutions established in 1967
1967 establishments in Georgia (U.S. state)